Angelo Glisoni (born 20 June 1957) is an Italian former yacht racer who competed in the 1992 Summer Olympics.

References

1957 births
Living people
Italian male sailors (sport)
Olympic sailors of Italy
Sailors at the 1992 Summer Olympics – Tornado
Tornado class world champions
World champions in sailing for Italy